Joseph Edward Moody (born January 9, 1981) is a lawyer from El Paso, Texas, who was Speaker Pro Tempore of the Texas House of Representatives.  He has represented District 78, based entirely in El Paso County, since 2013.  He is a member of the Democratic Party. Moody previously represented District 78 for the single term from 2009 to 2011. In 2012, he unseated the Republican Dee Margo, Mayor of El Paso from 2017 to 2021.

Moody defeated Margo in the general elections of both 2008 and 2012, but Margo prevailed in the 2010 contest, with lowered turnout in a mid-term election.

Moody won his fifth nonconsecutive term in the House in the general election held on November 6, 2018. With 31,361 votes (65.2 percent) and buoyed by the U.S. Senate candidacy of Beto O'Rourke, also an El Paso native, Moody overwhelmed the Republican candidate, Jeffrey Lane, who finished with 16,741 votes (34.8 percent).

After Moody and other Democrats left the state in protest of Republican legislation on July 12, 2021, Texas House Speaker Dade Phelan removed Moody from the Speaker Pro Tempore position in the 87th Legislature on July 15.

References

External links
 
 Biography at Ballotpedia
 Legislative page

|-

|-

1981 births
21st-century American politicians
Living people
Democratic Party members of the Texas House of Representatives
New Mexico State University alumni
Politicians from El Paso, Texas
Texas lawyers
Texas Tech University alumni